Narahari Haldankar is an Indian politician. He was elected to the Goa Legislative Assembly from Valpoi in the 1999 and 1999 Goa Legislative Assembly election as a member of the Bharatiya Janata Party. He was Deputy Speaker of the Goa Legislative Assembly from June 2002 to February 2005.

References

1950 births
Living people
Members of the Goa Legislative Assembly
Deputy Speakers of the Goa Legislative Assembly
People from South Goa district
Goa MLAs 1994–1999
Goa MLAs 2002–2007
Bharatiya Janata Party politicians from Goa